The women's shot put at the 2019 World Para Athletics Championships was held in Dubai in November 2019.

Medalists

Detailed results

F12 

The event was held on 8 November.

F20 

The event was held on 14 November.

F32 

The event was held on 11 November.

F33 

The event was held on 15 November.

F34 

The event was held on 12 November.

F35 

The event was held on 14 November.

F36 

The event was held on 12 November.

F37 

The event was held on 9 November.

F40 

The event was held on 15 November.

F41 

The event was held on 14 November.

F54 

The event was held on 12 November.

F57 

The event was held on 13 November.

F64 

The event was held on 13 November.

See also 
List of IPC world records in athletics

References 

shot put
2019 in women's athletics
Shot put at the World Para Athletics Championships